Grotte de Lombrives or Lombrives Cave is a large natural cavern located in Ornolac-Ussat-les-Bains, at the eastern edge of the Pyrénées Ariégeoises Natural Regional Park, in the Ariège department of Occitanie, in southwestern France.

It is still advertised as "the largest cave in Europe" on their website, but in 2017 the cave came under new management and a new website was created which removed the former's fantastically exaggerated statements, including a non-existent Guinness World Record. Those exaggerations persist online on numerous other web pages.

It is located inside a limestone mountain named Cap de la Lesse between the Vicdessos and Ariège valley. There are three caves in this mountain, Niaux and Sabart in the Vicdessos valley, Lombrives in the Ariège valley. The three levels are connected by numerous vertical shafts.

The cave has two huge chambers which are both part of the tourist trail. To make this size a little more understandable the guides compare it with the Cathedral of Notre-Dame in Paris, which would fit into the chamber. The even bigger Salle de l’Empire de Satan ("Chamber of the Empire of Satan") is the end of the long cave trekking tour which is also offered. The engineer and geologist Raoul Perpère (1864–1950) constructed a bridge across the pit in 1927, while he was developing the cave as a show cave. The cave has a great variety of speleothems or formations, including stalactites, stalagmites, rimstone pools, cave pearls, helictites, and calcite crystals.

The cave has served as a refuge throughout history. The earliest excavations by Félix Régnault took place in the late 19th century and confirmed human occupation during the Neolithic. It was also used for the burial of a Bronze Age man. Between the 12th and 14th centuries the "heretic" Cathars gathered at the site. Later the cave was a hideout for Huguenots.

Today the cave is a tourist attraction, offering a selection of guided tours lasting between two and five hours.

In 2021 the Deep Time experiment took place in the cave, during which a group of 15 volunteers spent 40 days in the cave as an experiment to see how the lack of clocks, daylight and external communications would affect them.

References

Links

 Grotte de Lombrives Official Website 
 Show Caves of France: Grotte de Lombrives
 Deep Time

Landforms of Ariège (department)
Tourist attractions in Ariège (department)
Caves of Occitania (administrative region)
Archaeological sites in France